Gamma is an unincorporated community in northeast Montgomery County, in the U.S. state of Missouri. The community is at the intersection of Missouri Routes E and CC on the south side of Elkhorn Creek. Middletown is 5.5 miles to the northwest.

History
A post office called Gamma was established in 1880, and remained in operation until 1920. It is unknown why the name "Gamma" was applied to this community.

References

Unincorporated communities in Montgomery County, Missouri
Unincorporated communities in Missouri